Glorious is a French Christian (Catholic) rock and worship music group, originally from Valence, Drôme, and based in Lyon, France. It was formed in 2000, following the World Youth Day, by three brothers from Valence.

Since 2000, Glorious has released eleven studio albums published by Rejoyce Musique: Glorious, Libre (Free), Des ombres et des lumières (Shadows and lights), Génération louange (Generation praise), Citoyens des cieux, (Citizens of heaven) Électro pop louange (Electro pop praise), Messe de la grâce (Mass of grace), 1 000 échos, Messe du Frat, (Mass of brotherhood) Noël (Christmas) and Promesse (Promise).  They also have three live albums, recorded at the Frat gathering in front of 12,000 young people in 2011, 2013 and 2015, as well as a single Une vie pour une génération (A life for a generation), which is a song tribute to Pope John Paul II This was briefly a best selling single.

The last album, "Promesse", arrived in November 2018.

History

The group was formed in 2000, following the World Youth Day, by three brothers from Valence: Aurélien, Benjamin and Thomas Pouzin

The group enjoyed good publicity from the release of their first album, Glorious, and they made some television appearances on French national television. They were invited on to Laurent Ruquier On a tout essayé and also Tout le monde en parle, presented by Thierry Ardisson. A report about the group also appeared on France 3 in 2013.

On 15 November 2010 Glorious released their fifth studio album, Citoyens des cieux (Citizens of Heaven) (2010, Joy to the World / Rejoyce), including 11 unreleased pieces of "pop praise" composed from biblical texts. The album was accompanied by a live DVD that delivered the first images of the group on the stage for a series of animated worship evenings in a church in the centre of Lyon (Saint-Croix church): the Lyon Centre evenings.

In April 2013, Glorious released a new studio album titled Électro pop louange (Electro pop praise), which ranked up to 70th place of the Itunes download charts. It was during this year that the group created the Worship Academy (based in their parish Lyon Centre – Sainte-Blandine in Lyon). This is a school of praise that allows a group of young people to spend a year of training in music and theology. The groups Hopen and Be Witness have already gone through this training.

On 4 July 2017, Glorious was on stage in Paris at the Angels Music Awards at Olympia, and supported, for the second time, la musique inspirée.

Glorious released the album "Noël" at the end of 2017, composed of traditional Christmas songs and some compositions.

In 2018, Glorious set to music the poem of Saint Thérèse of Lisieux for the album of Natasha St-Pier Aimer c'est tout donner (To love is to give everything). There are poems set to music as well as songs to Thérèse written and composed by the Pouzin brothers. In late 2018, Glorious release their new album "Promesse", with six clips recorded in their church and a duet with Natasha St-Pier: The Song of Songs.

Lyon Centre

Lyon Centre is a concept inspired by American evangelical churches. It takes place in the Church of St. Croix, Lyon and meets every Thursday evening. Over 300 young people come each week, with more than 40,000 visitors since its inception up to 2010.

After 2010, the Lyon Centre evenings took place once a month in the St. Croix church and since the end of 2013 at the St. Blandine church, also located in the 2nd arrondissement (district) of Lyon, and host on average 950 visitors each evening.

Currently, Glorious hosts Mass every Sunday night and run the Worship Academy, a school of praise that allows a group of young people to spend a year of training in music and theology so as to serve in evangelization, on a tour and/or by serving in a parish.

The Lyon Centre Conference, a weekend devoted to praise with church groups and preaching given by different speakers, has been held once a year since 2015. Ecumenism is very evident during these conferences, as speakers like the Christian Open Door Church, Mulhouse or Hillsong Church are invited.

Cardinal Philippe Barbarin, former archbishop of Lyon, was the initiator, along with Glorious, of this project. The Lyon Centre model is spreading all over Europe: Albi in France, Bologna in Italy, Barcelona in Spain.

Members

Current members
 Thomas Pouzin – piano, guitar, vocals
 Benjamin Pouzin – guitar, vocals 
 Emmanuel Robillard – bass
 David Grail – drums
 David Allevard – drums
 Obed Rajaiah – keyboard
 Pauline Bethuel – vocals

Former members

 Julien Sarazin – bass
 Anaël Pin – keyboard
 Aurélien Pouzin – guitar
 Jean Prat – drums
 Gaëtan Verrier Bert – guitar
 Marie Cazenave (formerly Marie Le Fichant) – vocals

Discography

Studio albums

Singles 
 2005 : Une vie pour une génération, single in homage to Pope John Paul II
 2011 : En Cristo, song for the JMJ 2011
 2012 : Nous dansons 
 2014 :  † = ♥ #DisLeAuMonde
 2015 : Notre Père
 2015 : Louez-Le
 2016 : Bienvenue, premier single du nouvel album, 1000 Échos
 2016 : Plus jamais le même
 2016 : Relever le faible
 2016 : Ave Maria with the young singers of Saint-Thomas d'Aquin
 2018 : Le Cantique des Cantiques (Duo with Natasha St-Pier)

Live albums

Notes and references

External links

 
 JoyMusic.fr
 Page MySpace officielle Glorious
 Rejoyce Musique
 Glorious, génération louange, a documentary by KTO, 21 June 2019

Musical groups established in 2000